The Thumbs is a small and jagged island, with three prominent spires and an area of , in south-eastern Australia.  It is part of the Tasman Island Group, lying close to the south-eastern coast of Tasmania around the Tasman Peninsula, and is in the Tasman National Park.

Fauna
Recorded breeding seabird species are common diving-petrel and black-faced cormorant.  Australian fur seals use the island as a haul-out site.  Together, The Thumbs and the nearby Hippolyte Rocks have been identified by BirdLife International as an Important Bird Area (IBA) because they support over 1% of the world population of black-faced cormorants.

References

Islands of Tasmania
Protected areas of Tasmania
Important Bird Areas of Tasmania